Joseph Gordon Carveth (March 21, 1918 – August 15, 1985) was a Canadian professional ice hockey player in the National Hockey League with the Boston Bruins, Montreal Canadiens, and Detroit Red Wings between 1940 and 1951. He was born in Regina, Saskatchewan.

Carveth began his NHL career with the Detroit Red Wings in 1940. After spending some time with the Wings' American Hockey League affiliate, the Indianapolis Capitals, he became a regular in the Red Wings lineup in 1942. He scored six goals in ten playoff games during Detroit's run to the Stanley Cup championship in 1943.

Carveth was traded to the Boston Bruins for Roy Conacher in 1946. The Bruins then sent him to the Montreal Canadiens for Jimmy Peters. Carveth returned to Detroit in 1949, winning his second Stanley Cup in 1950.

After the 1951 season, Carveth left the NHL, and split the 1951-52 season between the AHL's Cleveland Barons and the Vancouver Canucks of the PCHL. Carveth retired from professional hockey in 1954.

Awards and achievements
1943 Stanley Cup Championship  (Detroit)
1950 Stanley Cup Championship  (Detroit)
1950 NHL All Star  (Detroit)

Career statistics

Regular season and playoffs

External links

Picture of Joe Carveth's Name on the 1950 Stanley Cup Plaque

1918 births
1985 deaths
Boston Bruins players
Canadian ice hockey right wingers
Cleveland Barons (1937–1973) players
Detroit Red Wings players
Ice hockey people from Saskatchewan
Indianapolis Capitals players
Montreal Canadiens players
Sportspeople from Regina, Saskatchewan
Stanley Cup champions
Toledo Mercurys players
Canadian expatriates in the United States